La perla (The Pearl) is a 1947 Mexican-American film directed by Emilio Fernández. It is based on the 1947 novella The Pearl by John Steinbeck, who also co-wrote the screenplay.

In 2002, the film was selected for preservation in the United States National Film Registry by the Library of Congress as being "culturally, historically, or aesthetically significant".

Plot
In a fishing village in La Paz, Mexico, pearl fisherman Kino and his wife Juana are in anguish because their infant son Juanito was stung by a scorpion. The nearest doctor, a foreigner, refuses to treat him without adequate payment and he is taken instead to a curandero. The doctor does not want anything to do with the natives. Later, the doctor and his brother, a loan shark, meet Kino after he finds a valuable pearl and they decide to steal it from him.

One day, Kino stumbles upon a majestic pearl. He immediately grabs it and returns to his wife.

Juana, Kino's wife, is convinced that the pearl only brings bad luck and tries to convince Kino to return it to the sea. But Kino refuses to listen, hoping that the pearl will change their lives once he sells it. To Juana, the pearl represents death but for Kino, it represents freedom. Now that Kino is "rich" he wants to buy a gun and new shoes. He also wants his son to be able to read. Kino believes that if his son acquires knowledge, they will also gain knowledge, which will set them free. The villagers follow the family around with the pearl and play music while attempting to get a look at the pearl. The doctor that had refused to help Juanito tries to get the Pearl from the family by claiming he will help the already healthy infant son in exchange for the much more valuable pearl.

Once Kino and his family head to town, the dealers make him a deal that is not near the total worth for the pearl, and try to convince Kino that the pearl is worthless and the deal is the best he will get. The men want to prevent Kino from gaining social mobility, and they want him and his family to remain at the bottom of the social hierarchy. Kino does not accept the deal and decides to go to the city instead. Kino starts drinking with these men who were most likely only with him to get him intoxicated enough to get the pearl. But when the men try and rob him he doesn’t have the pearl. His wife had kept the Pearl on her as she knew something would happen to him.

Later on his brother comes to help and helps Kinos family escape through the night. The family is then chased, only confirming the predictions of Juana.

At one point Juana takes the pearl from Kino because she wants to throw it into the ocean. Kino chases after her, and hits her. The two decide that they are going to run away. They try to take a boat but they it tips over before they are able to get very far. As they run away they are followed by two natives and a man on a horse. The wife eventually gets very tired and she wants to be left alone. She does not have shoes and therefore her feet are very bloody. Kino refuses to leave her and she goes with him because he is her husband. Eventually the men have them trapped on a cliff. One of the men fires a shot which kills the baby. At the end Kino and Juana throw the pearl off of the highest ledge to get rid of it. The pearl gave Kino and his family a chance for a better life, but in their society it was completely unacceptable. The film depicts the issue of colorism where only those with fairer skin can have the money and resources to live comfortably. Kino and his family were considered to be indigenous, and therefore were seen as at the bottom of the social hierarchy. Everyone in the society tried to make sure that they stayed at the bottom of the social hierarchy, and try to steal the pearl from them. So in the end the pearl was not helpful at all, because the problem is how the society is structured and how those with fairer skin are favored.

Cast
 Pedro Armendáriz as Kino
 María Elena Marqués as Juana
 Fernando Wagner as Dealer 1
 Gilberto Gonzálezas Aid 1
 Charles Rooner as Doctor
 Juan García as Aid 2
 Alfonso Bedoya as Godfather
 Raúl Lechuga as Dealer 2
 Max Langler as Peasant

Reception

Critical response
When the film was released, Bosley Crowther, film critic for The New York Times, liked the film, writing, "An exceptional motion picture, both in content and genesis, is the beautiful and disturbing filmization of John Steinbeck's novelette, The Pearl, which reached an appropriate showcase at the Sutton Theatre yesterday. Exceptional it is in genesis by virtue of the fact that it was made in Mexico by a Mexican company with Mexican actors who speak English throughout. And extraordinary it is in content through the benefit of a story of primitive power, told with immaculate integrity through an eloquent camera."

More recently, film critic Dennis Schwartz gave the film a mixed review and wrote, "Though the film is clumsy in its characterizations, the shimmering gorgeous black-and-white photography by cinematographer Gabriel Figueroa makes the film seem potent."

To this day, the film is viewed with very much cultural importance and is highly renowned.

Accolades

Venice Film Festival - 1947
 Emilio Fernández  "Golden Lion"

Premio Ariel - 1948
Awarded
 Emilio Fernández "Golden Ariel"
 Pedro Armendáriz (actor)
 Juan García (supporting actor)
 Gabriel Figueroa (photography)

Nominated
 Gilberto Diego González (supporting actor)
 María Elena Marqués (actress)
 Gloria Schoemann (editing)
 Antonio Díaz Conde (score)
 Emilio Fernández (screenplay)
 Emilio Fernández  (director)

Golden Globe - 1949
 Gabriel Figueroa  (photography)

Madrid Film Festival - 1949
 Gabriel Figueroa (photography)

References

External links
 
 
 
 
 La Perla at the Cinema of Mexico site of ITESM 
 La perla informational site at Classic Film Guide
 

Films with screenplays by John Steinbeck
1947 drama films
1947 films
American black-and-white films
English-language Mexican films
Estudios Churubusco films
Films based on American novels
Films based on works by John Steinbeck
Films directed by Emilio Fernández
Films set in the 1940s
Films shot in Mexico
RKO Pictures films
Spanish-language American films
United States National Film Registry films
Mexican black-and-white films
Mexican drama films
American drama films
1940s American films
1940s Mexican films